Spring Ridge is a small town in northeastern New South Wales, Australia. In the  the population of the town was 389. It is in the electoral district of Upper Hunter and the federal division of New England.

Transport
It is served by a station on the Binnaway – Werris Creek railway line. Tungenbone Road is the only notable road running through town, in a west–east direction from Coonabarabran to Werris Creek.

Amenities
There are golf and tennis clubs in town, along with a hotel (The Royal), the general store and a primary school.

References

External links

 Street-Directory.com.au Map

Localities in New South Wales
Liverpool Plains Shire